Haščák is a surname. Notable people with the surname include:

Dávid Haščák (born 1998), Slovak football midfielder
Marcel Haščák (born 1987), Slovak ice hockey player
Marek Haščák (born 1985), Slovak ice hockey player

Slovak-language surnames